Sandemar Castle is a castle in Sweden. It is owned by Karin Mattson Nordin, daughter of the real estate developer John Mattson.

See also
List of castles in Sweden

Castles in Stockholm County